3rd Grenadier Guards F.C. were an English football team that played in the London League from as early as 1896 until  1898.  During the 1896–97 season they were champions and during the 1897–98 season they finished 4th. 		

In the 1909–10 season they joined the Spartan League B Division.  They gained promotion in their first season finishing third of sixth in their division. Participating in the Spartan League A Division for three more seasons they recorded finishes of 7th, 6th and 10th, before withdrawing in 1913.

See also
3rd Grenadier Guards F.C. players
Grenadier Guards
2nd Grenadier Guards F.C.

References
Football Club History Database

Third Grenadier Guards
Association football clubs disestablished in 1913
Defunct football clubs in London
3rd Grenad
1913 disestablishments in England
Association football clubs established in the 19th century
London League (football)
Spartan League
Military football clubs in England
Great Western Suburban League